Kirkdale Bridge is a bridge over the Kirkdale Burn in the parish of Kirkmabreck, between Gatehouse of Fleet and Creetown in Dumfries and Galloway, Scotland. It was built for Sir Samuel Hannay, based on designs drawn up by Robert Adam, but the execution was much simpler than Adam had originally envisaged, probably to reduce the construction costs.

The bridge was designated a Category A listed building in 1971. Several other buildings on the estate, also designed by Adam, are also listed as Category A, in separate designations.

History

Sir Samuel Hannay, a laird from Wigtonshire who had made a substantial fortune as a merchant in London, engaged Robert Adam to design Kirkdale House, and a series of other buildings on his estate at Kirkdale in the 1780s. Amongst these was a bridge to carry a road over the steep ravine of the Kirkdale Burn. Adam drew up plans for an elaborate three-span bridge, featuring swags and sphinxes, to be executed in ashlar masonry. The plans are now held by the Sir John Soane's Museum in London; the bridge as it was actually built however, around 1787, was a substantially simplified version of Adam's design, built largely of rubble and with many of the finer features missing, presumably to save money.

McGowan rebuilt the south elevation in the same manner as the original eighteenth-century bridge.

The bridge is no longer open to road traffic, but it is still in use as a footbridge. It was designated a Category A listed building in 1971; Kirkdale House, and several other buildings on the estate thought to have been designed by Adams, were separately listed.

Description
The bridge is mostly built of rubble, but has a band course of granite ashlar. The arches have rubble voussoirs and, in the spandrels between them, rubble oculi.

John R. Hume, the former chief inspector of historic buildings for Historic Scotland, describes the bridge as "distinctly plain and workmanlike, though handsomely proportioned".

References

Sources

External links
Database entry at Canmore with a gallery of images

Category A listed buildings in Dumfries and Galloway
Bridges in Scotland
18th-century establishments in Scotland
Bridges completed in 1787
Pedestrian bridges in Scotland